Suchitra Murali, commonly known by her stage name Suchitra, is an Indian actress. Debuting in a lead role with the 1990 film No.20 Madras Mail at the age of 14, she has appeared mostly in Malayalam films as well as a few films in Tamil.

Personal life

Suchitra had her primary education from Holy Angel's Convent Trivandrum.

Career
Suchitra, who debuted as a heroine in the film No.20 Madras Mail did numerous films in Malayalam in the 90s, mostly with heroes like Mammooty, Mohanlal, Mukesh, Jagadeesh and Siddique. Widely regarded as one of the most beautiful actresses in the 90s, Suchitra was very popular among the youth due to her eye-catching physique and her versatility in acting. By the time she left the industry at the young age of 26 she had already acted in 38 movies. She also acted in a handful of Tamil films. The 1991 release Gopura Vasalile, along with Karthik and Bhanupriya, was her most popular Tamil movie.

Suchitra is also a trained Indian Classical dancer. She was trained in Bharatanatyam, Mohiniyattam, and Kuchipudi by Guru V. Mythili.

Other activities

Suchitra was the Joint Secretary twice (1997-2000 & 2000–2003) in the AMMA. Her versatility and application during her tenure was well appreciated by the other members.
Suchitra was also seen recently as a celebrity judge in episodes of the popular reality shows Idea Star Singer and Vodafone Comedy Stars, both on Asianet. She also represented Kerala in the "Miss World Pageant" held in Bangalore in 1997.

Filmography

Television
Sambavami Yuge Yuge  (Surya TV) - Serial
Panam Tharum Padam (Mazhavil Manorama) - Game show

References

External links
 
 Suchithra at MSI

Living people
20th-century Indian actresses
21st-century Indian actresses
Actress (musician) albums
Actresses from Thiruvananthapuram
Actresses in Hindi cinema
Actresses in Malayalam cinema
Actresses in Malayalam television
Actresses in Tamil cinema
Child actresses in Malayalam cinema
Indian child actresses
Indian film actresses
Indian television presenters
Indian women television presenters
Place of birth missing (living people)
Year of birth missing (living people)